Allen Creek is a stream in southwestern Monroe County, Missouri. It is a tributary of the Elk Fork Salt River.

Allen Creek has the name of Charles Allen, the original owner of the site.

See also
List of rivers of Missouri

References

Rivers of Monroe County, Missouri
Rivers of Missouri
Upper Mississippi water resource region